Aïmen Demai (born 10 December 1982) is a former professional footballer who played as a defender or defensive midfielder. Born in France, he represented Algeria at youth levels internationally and made one appearance for the Algeria's senior national team before switching to the Tunisia national team.

International career
Demai played for the Algeria national team in the youth stages, before he switched to play for the Tunisia national team. He has one cap for the Algerian national team in a 1–0 win over Qatar in 2003. He also participated in a friendly against French club Rennes two days later. Demai was recalled by the Tunisian National Team coach Humberto Coelho for the friendly game against Netherlands on 11 February 2009.

Personal life
Demai was born in Thionville, France, to an Algerian father and a Tunisian mother.

References

External links
 
 

1982 births
Living people
People from Thionville
French sportspeople of Algerian descent
French sportspeople of Tunisian descent
Tunisian people of Algerian descent
Algerian people of Tunisian descent
Sportspeople from Moselle (department)
Algerian footballers
Tunisian footballers
French footballers
Association football defenders
Association football midfielders
Dual internationalists (football)
Algeria international footballers
Tunisia international footballers
FC Metz players
Ligue 1 players
1. FC Saarbrücken players
1. FC Kaiserslautern players
Alemannia Aachen players
2. Bundesliga players
3. Liga players
Algerian expatriate sportspeople in Germany
Tunisian expatriate sportspeople in Germany
Expatriate footballers in Germany
Footballers from Grand Est
French expatriate footballers
French expatriate sportspeople in Germany
Association football coaches